Nursted is a hamlet in the East Hampshire district of Hampshire, England. It is in the civil parish of Buriton.   It is 1.8 miles (2.7 km) southeast of Petersfield, on the B21466 road. The hamlet sits directly on the Hampshire/West Sussex border.

The nearest railway station is Petersfield, 1.8 miles (2.7 km) northwest of the village.

External links

Villages in Hampshire